The TKB-517 is an assault rifle designed by German Aleksandrovich Korobov. This rifle was externally similar to the AK-47, but based on the lever-delayed blowback mechanism invented by John Pedersen and refined by Pál Király. It turned out to be more reliable, more accurate and controllable under full auto, and easier to produce and maintain. Like the AK series, it was also manufactured with folding stocks, longer, heavier barrels with bipods (forming light support weapons) and even a belt-fed variant. Its rejection was because of a greater proficiency with the AK-47 among the Russian military, though it is just as likely it was rejected due to relatively high extraction pressure, which is a common issue firearms using lever-delayed blowback actions.

Design and features
The TKB-517 is externally similar to the AK-47 and field-strips similarly, but instead it uses lever-delayed blowback for its operation, slightly reducing recoil and making it more controllable. The receiver is made from pressed steel with laminated wood stock, grip and handguards.

See also
 Dlugov assault rifle
 TKB-059
 TKB-408
 VAHAN
 List of assault rifles

References

  
 
 Игорь Боечин, "Неизвестный Коробов", Оружие, 1998/5, pp. 2–10 (this gun on pp. 7–8)

7.62×39mm assault rifles
Lever-delayed blowback firearms
Assault rifles of the Soviet Union
Abandoned military projects of the Soviet Union
Tula Arms Plant products
Trial and research firearms of the Soviet Union